The St. Lawrence Saints represented St. Lawrence University in ECAC women's ice hockey during the 2014–15 NCAA Division I women's ice hockey season. The Saints continued a tradition of good, competitive hockey.

Offseason

The Saints had 16 players honored as members of the ECAC All-Academic Team

Recruiting

2014–15 Saints

Schedule

|-
!colspan=12 style=";"| Regular Season

|-
!colspan=12 style=";"| ECAC Tournament

Awards and honors
Amanda Boulier, D, All-ECAC Third Team

Brooke Webster, F, All-ECAC Third Team

Kennedy Marchment, F, All-ECAC Rookie Team

References

St. Lawrence
St. Lawrence Saints women's ice hockey seasons